Dadan Singh Yadav alias Dadan Pahalwan is an Indian politician. He was elected to the Bihar Legislative Assembly from Dumraon as the 2015 Member of Bihar Legislative Assembly as a member of the Janata Dal (United). He contested the 2014 Indian general election as a candidate of the Bahujan Samaj Party but lost.

References

Bihar MLAs 2015–2020
1964 births
Living people
Janata Dal (United) politicians
Criminals from Bihar
People from Buxar district
Candidates in the 2014 Indian general election